Gurnani is an Indian surname. Notable people with the surname include:

C. P. Gurnani (born 1958), Indian businessman 

Indian surnames